The 1974 Volvo International was a men's tennis tournament played on outdoor clay courts at the Mount Washington Resort in Bretton Woods, New Hampshire in the United States. The tournament was part of the 1974 Commercial Union Assurance Grand Prix and was classified in the Group B tier. It was the second edition of the tournament and was held from August 5 through August 9, 1974. First-seeded Rod Laver won the singles title.

Finals

Singles

 Rod Laver defeated  Harold Solomon 6–4, 6–3
 It was Laver's 6th singles title of the year and the 68th of his career in the Open Era.

Doubles

 Jeff Borowiak /  Rod Laver defeated  Georges Goven /  François Jauffret 6–3, 6–2
 It was Borowiak's 3rd title of the year and the 4th of his career. It was Laver's 9th title of the year and the 60th of his professional career.

References

External links
 ITF tournament edition details

 
Volvo International
Volvo International
Volvo International